The NWA New England Women's Heavyweight Championship was the primary women's professional wrestling title in the Century Wrestling Alliance. It was one of the first titles to be introduced when the promotion joined the National Wrestling Alliance and became NWA New England in January 1998. Violet Flame defeated Amanda Storm in Bridgeport, Connecticut on September 15, 1999, to become first champion. Amanda Storm was later awarded the title three months later, then lost the title to male wrestler Vince Viccalo whereupon it vacant in March 2000 and eventually abandoned.

Title history
Silver areas in the history indicate periods of unknown lineage.

References

National Wrestling Alliance championships
Women's professional wrestling championships
United States regional professional wrestling championships